Ivan Ntege (born 8 September 1994) is a Ugandan professional footballer who plays for KF Tirana in Albania and the Ugandan national team.

International career
In January 2014, coach Milutin Sredojević, invited him to be included in the Uganda national football team for the 2014 African Nations Championship. The team placed third in the group stage of the competition after beating Burkina Faso, drawing with Zimbabwe and losing to Morocco.

References

Living people
Uganda A' international footballers
2014 African Nations Championship players
Ugandan footballers
1994 births
Association football midfielders
Uganda international footballers
Ugandan expatriate sportspeople in Albania
Expatriate footballers in Albania
Ugandan expatriate footballers
KF Tirana players
Kampala Capital City Authority FC players
2016 African Nations Championship players